Dendrobangia is a genus of flowering plants in the family Metteniusaceae. It was formerly placed in the family Cardiopteridaceae. It was described as a genus in 1896.

Dendrobangia is native to South America and Costa Rica.

species
 Dendrobangia boliviana Rusby - Costa Rica, Colombia, Venezuela, Ecuador, Peru, Bolivia, Brazil
 Dendrobangia multinervia Ducke - Colombia, Ecuador, Peru, NW Brazil

References

External links
photo of herbarium specimen at Missouri Botanical Garden, collected in Bolivia, type specimen of Dendrobangia boliviana

Metteniusaceae
Asterid genera